William Henry Larrabee (February 21, 1870 – November 16, 1960) was an American physician and politician who served six terms as a U.S. Representative from Indiana from 1931 to 1943.

Early life
Larrabee was born on a farm near Crawfordsville, Indiana. He attended the public schools, Indiana Central Normal School at Danville, and Indiana State Normal School at Terre Haute. He taught in public schools at New Palestine, from 1889 until 1895, then attended Indiana School of Medicine at Indianapolis until 1898, and commenced the practice of medicine and surgery in New Palestine.

Political career
Larrabee served as the secretary of Hancock County Board of Health in 1917–18, and on the city council of New Palestine, 1916–20. In 1930 he was elected to Congress as a Democrat, serving until January 3, 1943. In Congress, he served as chairman of the Committee on the Census (Seventy-fourth and Seventy-fifth Congresses) and the Committee on Education (Seventy-fifth through Seventy-seventh Congresses)

Larrabee represented Indiana's 11th congressional district which included Hamilton County and the surrounding area.

During World War II Larrabee was against isolationism and campaigned in favor of helping the British throughout 1940. Due to this he engaged in many heated arguments with his fellow Democrat Louis Ludlow who was an isolationist (Ludlow's district consisted primarily of Indianapolis). In between July 25 of 1940 when France surrendered, and June 22 of 1941 when the Nazis invaded the Soviet Union, Britain was effectively alone.  During this time Larrabee, as well as his fellow Indiana congressmen John W. Boehne Jr. campaigned explicitly in favor of giving Britain any aid we could.  They were the only two Indiana representatives who voted in favor of the 1941 Lend Lease Act. Larrabee explicitly advocated entering the war on the British side throughout the year before Pearl Harbor.

Later career and death 
After losing the 1942 election, he resumed the practice of medicine and surgery. Larrabee died in New Palestine, Indiana and is buried in the New Palestine Cemetery.

References

External links

1870 births
1960 deaths
Physicians from Indiana
People from Montgomery County, Indiana
Canterbury College (Indiana) alumni
Indiana State University alumni
Democratic Party members of the United States House of Representatives from Indiana
People from New Palestine, Indiana